Sitara-e-Jurat (Star of Courage) is the third highest military award of Pakistan. It was established in 1957 after Pakistan became a republic; however, it was instituted retrospectively back to 1947. It is awarded for gallantry or distinguished service in combat; and can be bestowed upon officers, junior commissioned officers, petty officers, warrant officers, soldiers, sailors, airmen, and equivalents in the Pakistan Army, Navy, Air Force, and various paramilitary forces under federal control, such as the Frontier Corps, the Frontier Constabulary, and the Pakistan Rangers. It may be considered to be roughly equivalent to the Military Cross and the Silver Star.

List of recipients

Pakistan Army

Azad Kashmir Regiment, 1965
Captain Abdul Jalil (Shaheed) 14 AK Regiment at Kalidhar AJK 1965 War
Corps of Engineer,  1965

PA-4117 Lt.Col.(Major in 1965) Malik Aftab Ahmed Khan (SJ) FIRST Recipient of 1965,0045 hours, 7th, Sep. 1965
Frontier Force Regiment, 1965 
Major Shabbir Sharif Shaheed (NH, SJ)
Major Aqil Daad, 1965
Captain Sher Badshah Mahsud 5FF Kashmir War 1948
Major Ziauddin Ahmed Abbasi Shaheed (Received SJ for his fought bravely in Battlefield of Chowinda. Guides Cavalry
11 September 1965)PA-2163 Lt Col Muhammad Hayat Khan (4FFR) Zafarwal (12 September 1965), 
Lt. Col. (later Brigadier) Khalid Nazir (40 FFR)  Kargil, 1998

Punjab Regiment, 1965
PA-? Lt Col Asghar Ali Raja SJ 3rd Punjab Regiment for leading the surprise attack at Jassar bridge in 1965 against the Indian army.
PA-83 Major Muhammad Akbar Khan SJ(1948 Kashmir War)
PA-? Lt Col Muhammad Rafiq SJ
PA-882 Major General Muhammad Jamshed, MC SJ
PA-? Brigadier Muhammad Taj, SJ & Bar
PA-? Lt Col Tanvir Ahmed Khan SJ, SI(M)
PA-* Brigadier Abu Rashid, SJ & HI(M)
PSS-15177 Major Malik Munawar Khan Awan, SJ & Bar, 21 AK Regiment, Commander of only successful Ghaznavi Force of Operation Gibraltar.
Number-335139 Sepoy Maqbool Hussain, SJ, 4 AK Regiment.
PA-? Lieutenant Colonel Sahibzad Gul Shaheed
PA-? Captain Abdul Jalil Orakzai Shaheed 3rd Punjab Regiment at Kali-dhar AJK 1965 War
PA-? Capt Sagheer Hussain Shaheed, SJ. Punjab Regt.
PA-1525 Lt Col J.F. Golwalla, SJ. 16th Punjab Regt, 1965 War (Dograi)

6 Lancers, Armed Corps., Khem Karan, 1965

Major Mohammad Zia Uddin Uppal Shaheed, SJ, 30 SP (Wagah)
Abdul Rab Niazi 30 SP Artillery Regiment, Wagah, 1965   PSS 3682 Major Saiyid Naseem Haider Rizvi( Shaheed ) SJ 14BR Sialkot Sector 1965 war ( Recommended for Nishan-e-Haider)  53 Field Artillery, East Pakistan, 1971  PA. Brig Tariq Khalil (then Major) (SJ, IS with Bar, Gallantry), East Pakistan, 1971 Baloch Regiment, 1965 War
PA-? Capt Hafiz Muhammad Ahmad, SJ- 25th Cavalry
Major General Mumtaz Ali SJ & Bar
PA-919 * Brigadier M.Aslam Khan, SJ, Pakistan war hero- Liberation War Gilgit-Baltistan, 1948  29 Cavalry (Armoured Corps)
 2nd Lieutenant Abdul Mohsin Khalid Kark (Shaheed), 29 Cavalary, Kushtia, East Pakistan (now Bangladesh), 9 December 1971  
 Mujahida Hussain Bibi, SJ, 5 AK Regiment (1947- 48 Kashmir War) First Female Sitara-e-Jurat of Pakistan 
 Major Mujahid Mirani Shaheed - 26 November Salala 2011
 PSS 15720 Major Mohammad Din SJ 1965 1st AK Regiment  Unknown Regiment
PA- 6368 Major Muhummad Asjad Latif (Ord Depot Qta/2 E BR) (29-3-71 East Pakistan)
PA- 45622 Capt. Muhammad Umair Butt 
Lt.Col. Muhammad Sher Khan, SJ, 5 AK Regiment (1947- 48 Kashmir War) 
Capt Mehboob Niazi 9 FF  (1947- 48 Kashmir War)
Pakistan Navy
PN-643 Commander Zafar Muhammad Khan SJ & HJ, Submarine PNS/M Ghazi
Vice Admiral (Retd) Irfan Ahmed (SJ & HI-Military) - Indo-Pak War of 1971 (serving as Lieutenant on a PN Gunboat in erstwhile East Pakistan).  
Lieutenant Abdul Qayyum Khan PN
Admiral Shahid Karimullah - Indo-Pak War of 1971 - (Serving as a CO of a Gunboat during the war in East Pakistan)
Pakistan Air Force
Cecil Chaudhry
Flight Lieutenant Saiful Azam PAF's No. 17 Squadron from PAF Base Sargodha,  post 1971-joined BAF
 Muhammad Shafique
Iftikhar Ahmad Khan Ghory
Air Cdre Sayed Sajad Haider
Flt Lt (Later Air Marshal) Azim Daudpota
Sqn Ldr (Later Air Chief Marshal & Chief of Air Staff) Jamal Ahmed Khan
Wg Cdr (Later Air Chief Marshal & Chief of Air Staff) Anwar Shamim
Flt Lt (Later Air Chief Marshal & Chief of Air Staff) Hakimullah Khan Durrani
Sqn Ldr Ghani Akbar
Masood Ahmed Sikander
Syed Saad Akhtar Hatmi
Muhammad Mahmood Alam
Sarfraz Rafiqui
Imtiaz Bhatti
Farooq Umar
Flight Lieutenant Yusuf Ali Khan
ST Muhammad Hussain Warraich 
Wg Cdr Noman Ali Khan

See also

 Awards and decorations of the Pakistan military
 Pakistani Armed Forces

References

External links
Nishan-e-Haider, from Pakistan Television Corp (PTV). Television drama on Captain Raja Muhammad Sarwar Shaheed, Rashid Minhas Shaheed, and Major Raja Aziz Bhatti Shaheed
1965 first Air combat - a thrilling dog fight
PAF September account
Flying Start PAF opens its account in 1965
 opens September account
PAF Museum
Sqdn Ldr Sarfraz Ahmed Rafiqui
Air Attack - Outbreak of the WAR (Sept 1st - 6th)
Edward Haynes webpage on Pakistani awards
 Paktribune.com
 Decorations and Medals of Pakistan
 Pakistan's Medals 
 PAF

Military awards and decorations of Pakistan